Iraiweri is a village in Anggi district, Pegunungan Arfak Regency in West Papua province, Indonesia. Its population is 205.

Climate
Iraiweri has a subtropical highland climate (Cfb) with heavy rainfall year-round.

References

 Populated places in West Papua